Salomão is a Portuguese masculine given name and surname. It is the Portuguese form of Solomon. Notable people with the name include:

Given name
Salomão Barbosa Ferraz (1880–1969), Brazilian Roman Catholic priest
Salomão Coxi (born 2002), Angolan footballer
Salomão Mazuad Salha (born 1972), Lebanese footballer
Salomão Mondlane (born 1995), Mozambican footballer
Salomão Manuel Troco (born 1992), Angolan footballer

Surname
 Diogo Salomão (born 1988), Portuguese footballer
 Tomaz Salomão (born 1954), Mozambican economist
 Waly Salomão (1943–2003), Brazilian poet

Portuguese masculine given names
Portuguese-language surnames